Vincent Aderente (February 20, 1880 Naples, Italy - 1941 Bayside, Queens) was an Italian American muralist.

He studied at the Art Students League, and worked on the Waldorf-Astoria Hotel Ballroom.
He was an assistant to Edwin Blashfield.

His work is at St. Matthew's Cathedral, the Denver Mint, the Detroit Public Library, the United States Post Office (Flushing, Queens), the Queens County Court House, Kings County Hospital, the Long Island Savings Bank, and Codington County Courthouse (1929).

He lived in Queens.
His papers are in the Archives of American Art, and the Detroit Public Library.

Aderente's art was also used in First World War propaganda. His painting of Columbia, standing atop the United States and charging forward with a billowing flag and sword at her side, was appears on at least two official recruiting posters from this period.

References

External links
 

1880 births
1941 deaths
American muralists
19th-century Neapolitan people
Painters from New York City
Art Students League of New York alumni
Italian emigrants to the United States
20th-century American painters
American male painters
People from Bayside, Queens
20th-century American male artists